Brücken is a village and a former municipality in the Mansfeld-Südharz district, in Saxony-Anhalt, Germany. Since 1 January 2009, it is part of the municipality Brücken-Hackpfüffel.

History 
Brücken was referenced in a document at Hersfeld Abbey as Trizzebruccun at the start of the 9th Century.

The settlement of Brücken was awarded a town charter in 1518 by Kaiser Maximilian I, however this was withdrawn in the following centuries.

Brücken was occupied by US troops in April 1945, which were relieved by the Red Army in July of the same year.

Famous Residents
Johann Heinrich Gottlob von Justi (1717 - 1771), political economist, was born in the town

Former municipalities in Saxony-Anhalt
Mansfeld-Südharz